Bianca Biasi (born 13 May 1979) is an Australian producer, director, actress and author who has more recently specialised in projects involving supernatural or reportedly haunted locations, mostly on Sydney's northern beaches.

She appeared in soap opera Home and Away as Constable Pia Correlli.

Acting credits
 Home and Away as Constable Pia Correlli
 All Saints as Elly Chapman
 White Collar Blue as Francesca Decia
 Above the Law as Sheena Clancy
 Breakers as Melanie
 BeastMaster as Elka
 The Junction Boys as Nurse
 Burke & Wills as Asha
 Touched By Fellini as Waitress
 Soul Traces: The Introduction as Jasmine Dahlia
 Delirium as Constable Sophia Larkin
 The Parkway Hauntings as Bianca
 The Quarantine Hauntings as Marina Santini
 CNNNN: Chaser Non-stop News Network as Fungry's Customer
 Life Support

Feature films
In 2006, she made her feature film debut in Burke & Wills (Cake Productions) in the role of Asha.

Producer credits
As of 1 January 2014, Biasi's studio had four films in post-production: The Quarantine Hauntings, The Parkway Hauntings, Delirium and The Q Station Experiment.

The location on Wakehurst Parkway was the subject of "countless anonymous stories online that speak of a girl in a white dress that appears on the Middle Creek Bridge as unsuspecting drivers go through her, or a nun apparition that sits in the back seat of cars," The Daily Telegraph reported. It also reported that both films, The Parkway Hauntings and The Quarantine Hauntings would be released in 2015.

Other activity

Bianca is also an outspoken advocate of LGBT rights in Australia and has appeared with her partner in media coverage across various outlets as a same sex mothers of twin girls, to raise awareness of the increased risk of violence against same sex parents in the lead up to divisive debate that preceded the 2017 Same-sex marriageplebiscite and subsequent legislation allowing same sex marriage.

References

1979 births
Actresses from Sydney
Living people